There have been five baronetcies created for members of Clan Ramsay, four in the Baronetage of Nova Scotia and one in the Baronetage of the United Kingdom.

The Ramsay Baronetcy, of Balmaine in the County of Kincardineshire, was created in the Baronetage of Nova Scotia on 3 September 1625 for Gilbert Ramsay, the son of David Ramsay (died 1636) and Margaret Ogilvie, daughter of Sir Gilbert Ogilvie of Ogilvie. David Ramsay was MP for Kincardineshire in the Parliament of Scotland and the grandson of John Ramsay, Lord Bothwell. The fourth Baronet was one of the Scottish representatives to the 1st Parliament of Great Britain and subsequently sat for Kincardineshire in the British Parliament. The fifth and sixth Baronets also represented Kincardineshire in the House of Commons. The latter assumed the additional surname of Irvine. Alexander Ramsay-Irvine, the 6th Baronet, died without sons 11 February 1806, at which point the Nova Scotia baronetcy either became extinct or dormant (though two relatives styled themselves as the next baronet, without proving parentage).

The Ramsay Baronetcy, of Whitehill in the County of Edinburgh, was created in the Baronetage of Nova Scotia on 2 June 1665 for John Ramsay. The title became extinct on the death of the fifth Baronet in 1744.

The Ramsay Baronetcy, of Bamff in the County of Perth, was created in the Baronetage of Nova Scotia on 3 December 1666 for Gilbert Ramsay. The title became extinct on the death of the twelfth Baronet in 1986.

The Ramsay Baronetcy, of Abbotshall in the County of Fife, was created in the Baronetage of Nova Scotia on 23 June 1669 for Andrew Ramsay. The title became extinct on the death of the second Baronet in 1709.

The Ramsay Baronetcy, of Balmain in the County of Kincardine, was created in the Baronetage of the United Kingdom on 13 May 1806 for Alexander Ramsay.  Alexander Burnett was the second son of Catherine Ramsay, the granddaughter of Sir Charles Ramsay, 3rd Baronet of Balmain of the earlier creation (1625) in the Baronetage of Nova Scotia, which was inherited by her brother, Sir Alexander Ramsay-Irvine, 6th Baronet. Catherine Ramsay married Sir Thomas Burnett of Leys, 6th Baronet, and their eldest son, Robert, inherited the Burnett baronetcy, while their second son, Alexander Burnett, was his maternal uncle's namesake and heir. Sir Alexander Ramsay, 6th Baronet bequeathed his estates to his nephew and the baronetcy was revived in favour of Burnett a few months after Sir Alexander's death, who changed his surname to Ramsay by royal licence.

The second Baronet sat as Member of Parliament for MP for Kincardineshire. The third Baronet was Member of Parliament for Rochdale. The seventh and present Baronet is the presumed heir to the dormant Burnett Baronetcy of Leys.

William Alexander Ramsay, eldest son of Captain Francis Ramsay, third son of the second Baronet, was a brigadier-general in the British Army. His son Sir Bertram Ramsay was an admiral in the Royal Navy.

Ramsay, later Ramsay-Irvine baronets, of Balmain (1625)
Sir Gilbert Ramsay, 1st Baronet (died )
Sir David Ramsay, 2nd Baronet (died 1673)
Sir Charles Ramsay, 3rd Baronet (died 1695)
Sir David Ramsay, 4th Baronet (died 1710)
Sir Alexander Ramsay, 5th Baronet (–1754)
Sir Alexander Ramsay-Irvine, 6th Baronet (died 1806)

Ramsay baronets, of Whitehill (1665)
Sir John Ramsay, 1st Baronet (1624–1674)
Sir John Ramsay, 2nd Baronet (1645–1715)
Sir John Ramsay, 3rd Baronet (died 1717)
Sir Andrew Ramsay, 4th Baronet (1678–1721)
Sir John Ramsay, 5th Baronet (1720–1744)

Ramsay baronets, of Bamff (1666)

Sir Gilbert Ramsay, 1st Baronet (died )
Sir James Ramsay, 2nd Baronet (died 1730)
Sir John Ramsay, 3rd Baronet (died 1738)
Sir James Ramsay, 4th Baronet (–1782)
Sir John Ramsay, 5th Baronet (died 1783)
Sir George Ramsay, 6th Baronet (killed in a duel 1790)
Sir William Ramsay, 7th Baronet (died 1807)
Sir James Ramsay, 8th Baronet FRSE (1797–1859)
Sir George Ramsay, 9th Baronet (1800–1871)
Sir James Henry Ramsay, 10th Baronet (1832–1925)
Sir James George Ramsay, 11th Baronet (1878–1959)
Sir Neis Alexander Ramsay, 12th Baronet (1909–1986)

Ramsay baronets, of Abbotshall (1669)
Sir Andrew Ramsay, 1st Baronet (1648–1680)
Sir Andrew Ramsay, 2nd Baronet (died 1709)

Ramsay baronets, of Balmain (1806)

Sir Alexander Burnett Ramsay, 1st Baronet (1757–1810)
Sir Alexander Ramsay, 2nd Baronet (1785–1852)
Sir Alexander Ramsay, 3rd Baronet (1813–1875)
Sir Alexander Entwisle Ramsay, 4th Baronet (1837–1902)
Sir Herbert Ramsay, 5th Baronet (1868–1924)
Sir Alexander Burnett Ramsay, 6th Baronet (1903–1965)
Sir Alexander William Burnett Ramsay, 7th Baronet (born 1938). He is also the heir to the Burnett Baronetcy, of Leys.

The heir apparent to the baronetcy is Alexander David Ramsay of Balmain (born 1966), eldest of three sons of the 7th Baronet.

See also
Ramsay-Steel-Maitland baronets
Ramsay-Fairfax-Lucy baronets
Burnett baronets

References

Baronetcies in the Baronetage of the United Kingdom
Dormant baronetcies in the Baronetage of Nova Scotia
Extinct baronetcies in the Baronetage of Nova Scotia
1625 establishments in Nova Scotia
1665 establishments in Nova Scotia
1666 establishments in Nova Scotia
1669 establishments in Nova Scotia
1806 establishments in the United Kingdom